William Graham, 2nd Duke of Montrose (27 August 1712 – 23 September 1790) was the son of James Graham, 1st Duke of Montrose, and his wife, Christian Carnegie. He married Lady Lucy Manners, daughter of John Manners, 2nd Duke of Rutland on 28 October 1742.  He died at age 78 in Twickenham, London, England.

1712 births
1790 deaths
202
Montrose, 2nd Duke of